Christian Kloepfer (December 22, 1847 – February 9, 1913) was a wholesale merchant and political figure in Ontario, Canada. He represented Wellington South in the House of Commons of Canada from 1896 to 1900 as a Conservative.

He was born in New Germany, Waterloo County, Canada West, the son of German immigrants. Kloepfer sold hardware for carriages. In 1880, he married Elizabeth Murray. Kloepfer ran unsuccessfully for reelection in 1900 and 1904. He served as a member of the municipal council for Guelph. Kloepfer was a director of the Traders Bank of Canada. He died in Guelph at the age of 65.

Electoral record

References 

Members of the House of Commons of Canada from Ontario
Conservative Party of Canada (1867–1942) MPs
1847 births
1913 deaths